Bhaiṣajyarāja (Skt: भैषज्यराज; Traditional Chinese: 藥王; Simplified Chinese: 药王; pinyin: yào wáng; Japanese: 薬王 Yakuō; Vietnamese: Dược Vương Bồ Tát), or Medicine King, is a bodhisattva mentioned within the Lotus Sutra and the Bhaiṣajyarāja-bhaiṣajyasamudgata-sūtra (Sūtra Spoken by the Buddha on Visualizing the Two Bodhisattvas Bhaisajyarāja and Bhaisajyasamudgata). In chapter 23 of the Lotus Sutra (The Bodhisattva Bhaiṣajyarāja), the Buddha tells the story of the 'Medicine King' Bodhisattva, who, in a previous life, burnt his body as a supreme offering to a Buddha. He is said to have been reborn over a period of numerous lifetimes healing and curing diseases, and is a representation of the healing power of the Buddha.

Medicine King Bodhisattva is also found in The High King Avalokitesvara Sutra. 

Together with Supreme Medicine Bodhisattva, Sunlight Radiance Bodhisattva, Moonlight Radiance Bodhisattva and the Twelve Great Yaksa Generals, he forms the retinue of Lapis-lazuli Medicine Buddha.

Notes

References 

Suzuki, Takayasu (2014). The Compilers of the Bhaisajyarajapurvayoga-parivarta Who Did Not Know the Rigid Distinction between Stupa and Caitya in the Saddharmapundarika. Journal of Indian and Buddhist Studies 62 (3), 1185-1193

Yün-hua, Jan (1965). Buddhist Self-Immolation in Medieval China, History of Religions, 4 (2), 243-268

External links 
 SGI Library Online — The Soka Gakkai Dictionary of Buddhism 

Bodhisattvas
Bhaiṣajyaguru Buddha
Exorcism in Buddhism
Lotus Sutra